Mohsen Al-Garni (also Mohsen Al-Qarni) is a midfielder in Saudi Arabia.

He played for all Al Nassr FC teams: under 17, under 20, under 23, and the first team.

He was a member of the Saudi football team under 23 years during the 2008 Summer Olympics qualifications.

References

Saudi Arabian footballers
Living people
1985 births
Al Nassr FC players
Al-Raed FC players
Al-Faisaly FC players
Al-Riyadh SC players
Najran SC players
Al-Shoulla FC players
Al-Diriyah Club players
Al-Kawkab FC players
Saudi First Division League players
Saudi Professional League players
Saudi Second Division players
Association football midfielders